Shi Lei is the name of:

Shi Lei (diver), see 1997 FINA Diving World Cup#Women
Shi Lei (footballer), see Dalian Shide F.C.
Seok Ha-jung (born Shi Lei, 1985), South Korean table tennis player
Tatsuo Nomura (born Shi Lei, 1986), Japanese software developer
Shi Lei, the defendant in United States v. Shi, a 2008 piracy case